An Chi-hong (Hangul: 안치홍, Hanja: 安致弘) (born July 2, 1990) is a South Korean infielder who plays for the Lotte Giants of the KBO League. He bats and throws right-handed.

Amateur career
While attending Seoul High School in Seoul, An was considered one of the top shortstops in the Korean high school baseball league. As a sophomore, he drew national attention at the President's Cup National High School Baseball Championship held in April 2007, where his team finished runner-up and An won batting, home runs and RBI titles.

Professional career
Drafted by the Kia Tigers in the 2nd round (1st pick, 9th overall) of the 2009 KBO Draft, An made his pro debut on April 4, . On July 2, he became the fourth straight-from-high-school rookie to hit double digit home runs in KBO history, smacking two home runs against the Samsung Lions.

An was selected for the Best 10 of the 2009 KBO All-Star Game. In the All-Star Game in Gwangju on July 25, A hit a two-run home run in the 5th inning, which made him the youngest ever to be named KBO All-Star Game MVP.

An finished his rookie season with a batting average of .235 (44th in the league) and 14 home runs. Although An was the only rookie player to be eligible for the batting title in the 2009 season, having 436 plate appearances in 123 games, he failed to make the Rookie of the Year title, losing out to saves champion Lee Yong-Chan of the Doosan Bears.

International career
In August 2007, he was selected for the South Korea national junior baseball team and participated in the Asian Junior Baseball Championship held in Taichung, Taiwan.

In , An was selected for the South Korea national junior baseball team again to compete at the World Junior Baseball Championship, where they claimed their fifth tournament title. In the tourney, he batted .333 (10-for-30) with 8 RBIs and 8 runs, playing in all 8 games as a second and third baseman, and was named Best Defensive Player.

In 2018, he represented South Korea at the 2018 Asian Games.

Awards and honors
2009 All-Star Game MVP
2011 Gold Glove second baseman.

References

External links 
 Career statistics and player information from the KBO official website

1990 births
Living people
Baseball players at the 2018 Asian Games
Asian Games gold medalists for South Korea
Medalists at the 2018 Asian Games
Asian Games medalists in baseball
KBO League second basemen
Kia Tigers players
South Korean baseball players
Baseball players from Seoul